Interdependent Media (also referred to as "iM" or "iM Culture") is a U.S. independent record label based in Oakland, California.

History
iM was founded by MC/producer Evan Phillips (stage name Truthlive) with the help of his brother, Kyle Phillips, and father, Jethren Phillips, in late 2005.  The companies musical projects are currently distributed by Fontana/Universal.

Interdependent Media is part of a Bay Area entertainment collective/building called "The Zoo."

Interdependent Media artists have worked with notable hip hop artists such as; Hieroglyphics, DJ Premier, Jake One, J Dilla, Black Milk, 88 Keys, Blu, Mos Def, Damian Marley, Little Brother, Blackalicious, Ras Kass, Planet Asia, Souls Of Mischief, Questlove, and more.

Artists
K'Naan
J Davey
Tanya Morgan
Shaya
Eyezon
Truthlive
Windimoto
Finale
Sin
Canibus
Note: Artists are from Interdependent Media's website.

References

American independent record labels